The athletics competition at the 2011 European Youth Summer Olympic Festival was held from 25 to 29 July 2011. The events took place at the Söğütlü Athletics Stadium in Trabzon, Turkey. Boys and girls born 1994 or 1995 or later participated 36 track and field events, divided evenly between the sexes.

The five-day competition was preceded by the 2011 World Youth Championships in Athletics and a number of athletes participated at both meetings. Bence Pásztor of Hungary set a world youth best of 84.41 metres to win the boy's hammer throw, while Yuriy Kushniruk of Ukraine set a European youth best in the javelin throw (his mark of 83.42 m was second only to Argentina's Braian Toledo).

Internationally, the championships was evenly matched and no one country dominated as 26 nations had a medal-winning athlete. Three countries each attained a total of ten medals: Great Britain topped the medal table with five gold medals and four silvers, Ukraine was a close runner-up with five gold and three silvers, while Russia came third with four golds. France and Italy were also strong performers, with totals of nine and eight medals, respectively.

Medal summary

Boys

Girls

Medal table

See also
 European Youth Olympic Festival

References

External links
Athletics page at official festival website

2011 European Youth Summer Olympic Festival
European Youth Summer Olympic Festival
2011
International athletics competitions hosted by Turkey